Campa may refer to:

 Asháninka, an indigenous people living in Peru and Acre (state), Brazil
 Campa languages
 CAMPA bill, India
 Câmpa, a tributary of the river Jiul de Est in Romania
 Campa Cola, a soft drink brand in India
 The historical Campā or Champa polities of South-East Asia

People with the surname
 Cesare Campa (born 1943), Italian politician
 Felipe Campa (born 1979), Mexican boxer
 Joe Campa, United States Navy sailor
 Miranda Campa (born 1914), Swiss-Italian actress
 Pio Campa (1881–1964), Italian actor
 Riccardo Campa (born 1967), Italian sociologist
 Roberto Campa (born 1957), Mexican lawyer and politician
 Valentín Campa (1904–1999), Mexican railway union leader and presidential candidate
 Ammar Campa-Najjar (born 1989), American Democratic politician

See also
 La Campa, a municipality and small town in Honduras
 Campa, alias of American music producer David Benjamin Singer-Vine of Terror Jr